Noos may refer to 

 Nous or noos, concept in Greek philosophy
 Noos, French cable operator and ISP now merged with Numericable
 North West Shelf Operational Oceanographic System (NOOS)
 Nóos case, corruption case in Spain
 Joseph François Noos (1766 – 1826), French army officer